Logan County, West Virginia, has a long and colorful history of political scandal and corruption.

Historic bribes
Logan County has been notorious for over a century for political machines that control virtually all aspects of elected office. Allies of candidate John F. Kennedy once famously asked local political boss Raymond Chafin how much money he wanted so that Kennedy could carry southern West Virginia in the 1960 presidential election, and Chafin replied "thirty five," meaning $3,500. Kennedy's men returned with a suitcase full of $35,000, making it one of the more famous instances of miscommunication in the greasing of political palms in Logan history.

2004 sting
During the 2004 election season in the town of Logan, the Federal Bureau of Investigation (FBI), in a controversial move, had four-term mayor Thomas Esposito run for the West Virginia House of Delegates in order to ferret out corruption in Logan County politics. Officials in neighboring Lincoln County were also charged.

Others charged with crimes as a result of the sting
Other public figures were charged with federal crimes and forced to resign. The following men were implicated in the sting:

Logan County Clerk Glen Dale "Houn' Dog" Adkins admitted he sold his vote for $500 in 1996.
Perry French Harvey, Jr., former UMWA official, pleaded guilty to conspiring to bribe voters.
Ernie Ray Mangus was granted immunity against the charge of receiving $1,000 to buy votes in exchange for his cooperation.
"Big" John Mendez, Sheriff of Logan County, was compelled to resign and barred for life from running for public office.
Logan police chief Alvin "Chipper" Porter Jr. and Logan VFW president Ernest Stapleton both entered related guilty pleas.
Lincoln County Circuit Clerk Greg Stowers entered a guilty plea to a federal vote-buying charge in a probe directed by Assistant U.S. Attorney Karen George.

Voter disenfranchisement controversy
Although Esposito was a sham candidate controlled by the federal government, he received 2,175 votes in his faked bid to be elected to the 19th District of West Virginia's House of Delegates. Greg Campbell, Perry Harvey's attorney, argued unsuccessfully before District Judge David A. Faber that Esposito's faked campaign interfered with an election and disenfranchised everyone voting for him. Judge Faber took thirty minutes to decide that the votes were irrelevant.

References

External links

Full, free articles:

Free abstracts only; full articles available for purchase:

The abstract is so short as to be useless without the full article.

Logan County, West Virginia
Logan County
Logan County, West Virginia